Georges Ballery (born 18 July 1937) is a French wrestler. He competed at the 1960 Summer Olympics and the 1964 Summer Olympics.

References

External links
 

1937 births
Living people
French male sport wrestlers
Olympic wrestlers of France
Wrestlers at the 1960 Summer Olympics
Wrestlers at the 1964 Summer Olympics
Sportspeople from Paris